The Marcosians were a Gnostic sect founded by Marcus, active in Lyon, France and southern Europe from the second to the 4th century. Women held special status in the Marcosian communities; they were regarded as prophetesses and participated in administering the Eucharistic rites.  Irenaeus accuses Marcus of seducing his followers, and scornfully writes (Adversus Haereses I. 13, 4) that the whole sect was an affair of "silly women."

The Marcosian system was a variation of that of Valentinus. It retained the 30 Aeons, but called them "Greatnesses" and gave them numerical values. It kept the myth of the fall of Sophia but called it a "Divine Deficiency". Unique to it was the adaptation of the Pythagorean number theory (Isopsephy) to Gnosticism.

System
Marcus holds his knowledge to be the product of a divine revelation of the body of the Anthropos:

Theory of letters
Sometimes Marcus counts the number of letters in a name, sometimes he reckons up the sum total, when to each letter is given its value in the Greek arithmetical notation: sometimes he uses a method which enables him to find still deeper mysteries.

Marcus points out that if we take a single letter, Δ, and write its name at full length, δέλτα, we get five letters; but we may write again the names of these at full length and get a number of letters more, and so on ad infinitum. If the mysteries contained in a single letter be thus infinite, what must be the immensity of those contained in the name of the Propator.

Concerning this name he gives the following account:—When the first Father, who is above thought and without substance, willed the unspeakable to become spoken, and the invisible to become formed, He opened His mouth and emitted a Word like Himself, which being the form of the invisible, declared to Himself what He was. His name consisted of four syllables successively uttered, of four, four, ten, and twelve letters respectively.

It might appear as if we were to understand as the first of these the word ἀρχή; and this name of four syllables and thirty letters seems to correspond to a description of the system of thirty Aeons divided into two Tetrads, a Decad, and a Dodecad. Each letter is one of the Aeons, and contains within itself an infinity of mysteries. Each letter makes its own sound, it knows not the sound of the adjacent letter, nor of the whole, but the restitution of all things will take place when all the letters are brought to make the same sound, and then a harmony will result of which we have an image in that made when we all sound the Amen together.

This comparison shows an interesting point of agreement in liturgical usage between the Gnostics of the 2nd century and the Roman church of the time of Jerome, whose well-known words are "ad similitudinem caelestis tonitrui Amen reboat." What is stated about the limited knowledge of each Aeon may be compared with what Hippolytus of Rome tells of the Docetae (viii. 10).

Tetrad

Marcus pushes into further details his designation of the Aeons as letters of the alphabet. There are twenty-four letters in the alphabet, and twenty-four is the sum of the letters of the names of the first tetrad: 
The Unspeakable (ἄῤῥητος)
Silence (σειγή)
Father (πατήρ)
Truth (ἀλήθεια)

Followed by those of the second tetrad:

Word (λόγος)
Life (ζωή)
Man (ἄνθρωπος)
Church (ἐκκλησία)

These form the Ogdoad. Again, the Greek alphabet consists of nine mutes, eight semivowels, and seven vowels. The mutes belong to Father and Truth (The Unspeakable, and Silence, of course, do not count); these being mute reveal nothing to man. The semivowels belong to Word and Life, but the vowels to Man and Church, since it was a voice coming through Man which gave power to all.

For the seven heavens, we are told, utter each its own vowel sound, the first A and so on; and it was the sound of their united doxology borne to the earth, which gave generation to all things on the earth. By the descent of Him who was with the Father from the nine into the seven, the groups of Aeons were equalized and perfect harmony produced.

Ἰησοῦς
In the Greek arithmetical notation eight letters are used to denote units, eight tens, and eight hundreds: total 888; but this is exactly the numerical value of the letters in the name Ἰησοῦς. Similarly, the Α and Ω is identified with the περιστερά which descended on Jesus, the numerical value being in both cases 801.

Other mysteries are found in the six letters of the name Ἰησοῦς (see Episemon, below), the eight letters of χρειστός, which again added to the four of Υίος make twelve. These, however, are only the spoken names known to ordinary Christians; the unspoken names of Jesus and Christ are of twenty-four and thirty letters respectively. Either Hippolytus, or an early copyist of his, makes an attempt to solve the mystery of the unspoken names by writing at full length the letters of the name χρειστός; χεῖ, ῥώ, εἴ, ἰῶτα, σίγμα, ταῦ, οὐ, σάν; but we have here only twenty-four letters instead of thirty, so we must be content to remain in ignorance of what would seem to have been one of the most valuable secrets of this sect.

Aeons
To understand the generation of the thirty Aeons from the Ogdoad, we have only to take the first eight numbers and add them up, leaving out six—for it is the Episemon and not a letter of the usual Greek alphabet:—
1 + 2 + 3 + 4 + 5 + 7 + 8 = 30 
Again, we find the fall of the twelfth Aeon, Sophia, indicated in the alphabet; for Λ, which arithmetically denotes 30, the number of the Aeons, is only the eleventh letter in the alphabet. But it set about to seek another like itself, and so the next letter is M, or ΛΛ. Again, add up the numerical value of all the letters of the alphabet ending with λ and we have ninety-nine; that is deficiency, a number still counted on the left hand, which they who have "knowledge" escape by following after the one which, added to ninety-nine, transfers them to the right hand. The reader will remember Juvenal's "jam dextera computat annos."

Episemon
Even numbers are female, odd numbers male, by the union of the first of these, 2 and 3, was begotten the Episemon, or 6, the number of Salvation.

In the account of his system given by Irenaeus (I. xiv.), copied by Hippolytus (Ref. vi. 45) and by Epiphanius (Haer. 34), τὸ ἐπίσημον is repeatedly used to denote the numerical character for six; the number 6 is ὁ ἐπίσημος ἀριθμός; the six-lettered name Ἰησοῦς is τὸ ἐπίσημον ὄνομα, etc., language perplexing to the old Latin translator, who renders the word by "insignis."
A similar use of the word is found in Clement of Alexandria (Strom. vi. 16); but this cannot be called a quite independent illustration, for the coincidences are found to be such as to put it beyond doubt that Clement, in his account of the mysteries of the number 6, makes unacknowledged use of the same writings of Marcus as were employed by Irenaeus. Eusebius (Quaest. ad Marin. Mai, Nov. Pat. Bib. iv. 299), copied by Jerome or Pseudo-Jerome (Brev. in Psal. 77, vii. 198, ed. Vallars.), suggests, as a way of reconciling the difference between the evangelists as to whether the Lord suffered at the third or the sixth hour, that a transcriber's error may have arisen from the likeness of Gamma and the Episemon, i.e. apparently Γ and Ϝ.

The source whence all modern writers have learned their use of the word episemon is Joseph Justus Scaliger's essay on the origin of the Ionic letters. He there quotes as from Bede, de Indigitatione, a statement of an old grammarian, who, having mentioned that the Greeks denote numbers by letters, and for this purpose join to the letters of their alphabet three other characters, goes on as follows:—
Prima est ς quae dicitur Episimon et est nota numeri VI.; secunda est G quae vocatur kophe et valet in numero XC.; tertia est ϡ quae dicitur enneacosia quia valent DCCCC. 
Here, as well as in the preceding passages, episemon is used with special reference to the character for six; but Scaliger turns into Greek the phrase "nota numeri VI." τὸ ἐπίσημον τοῦ ἑξ ἀριθμοῦ, and seems to have inferred that the marks for the numbers 90 and 900 had equal rights to the same title; and he also gives the name Episemon to each of the six Phoenician letters said not to have been received by the Ionians, saying, for instance, that the letter ἧτα  was originally an episemon, and distinguishing between the episemon of the number 6 and the digamma or episemon of Vau. He does not name his authority for this way of speaking; nor do we know that the character which was by some called βαῦ, and by others τὸ ἐπίσημον, was ever called by any one before Scaliger by the combination ἐπίσημον βαῦ. However this may be, Scaliger has been followed by all who have written on the subject since his time.

The true account of these three characters seems to be that though the Phoenicians themselves did not use the letters of their alphabet for purposes of numeration, the Greeks, who derived their alphabet from them, did so in the 5th century BC; that their alphabet then still contained two of the Phoenician letters which in the next century were disused, viz., βαῦ in the sixth place, and κόππα, the Roman Q, coming after π; that these letters then took their natural place in the system of numeration, which was afterwards made complete by the addition, at the end of the letters of the alphabet, of another character to denote 900, which from its shape was at a considerably later period called σανπῖ. The character for six had not come to be identified with the abbreviation for στ in the time of Marcus, as known through Hippolytus. In calculating the numerical value of χρειστός he counts the σ and τ separately; and he calls the former s Sigma, and the latter San. It is possible that Marcus expressly identified his episemon with the digamma, for though in Irenaeus, the reading is undoubtedly διπλο γράμματα, the context gives probability to Dr. Hort's conjecture that Marcus wrote γάμματα. He says that this number added to the number of the twenty-four letters makes thirty. Now the double letters are already included in the twenty-four, but the Digamma stands outside the alphabet, and therefore its number might properly be added to that of the letters.

Six
With regard to the properties of the number 6, Marcus and Clement were in part indebted to Philo of Alexandria, who explains (De Op. Mund. 3) that it is the first perfect number, i.e., according to Euclid's definition, one equal to the sum of the numbers 1, 2, 3 which divide it without remainder (Aug. de Civ. Dei, xi. 30), the second such number being 28, which is the sum of its divisors 1, 2, 4, 7, 14 (Orig. t. 28 in S. Joann.); that being 2 × 3 it arises from the marriage of a male and female, i.e., odd and even number; that there are six directions of motion, forward, backward, right, left, up, down; etc. Marcus observed that 
 The world was made in six days
 In the new dispensation Jesus after six days went up to the Mount of Transfiguration
 There, by the appearance of Moses and Elijah, the number of His company became six
 He suffered at the sixth hour of the sixth day of the week
And thence concludes that this number has the power not only of production, but of regeneration. As seven is the number of the heavens, and eight is the supercelestial ogdoad, so six denotes the material creation (see also Heracleon); and, in particular, the material body through which the Saviour revealed Himself to men's senses, and conveyed to them that enlightenment of their ignorance in which redemption consisted. Clement, if not Marcus, finds the Saviour's higher nature represented by the episemon, which is not taken into account by one who looks merely at the order of the letters in the alphabet, but reveals itself in the system of numeration.

Irenaeus points out that the mysteries of Marcus all depend on the employment of the modern form of the Greek alphabet, and that they disappear when a Semitic alphabet is used. He shows also (ii. 24) that it is possible to say as fine things about the properties of the number 5 as about those of the numbers which are glorified by Marcus.

Practices

The Marcosians had formulae and sacraments of redemption. If so great mysteries were contained in names, it naturally followed that to know the right name of each celestial power was a matter of vital importance; and such knowledge the teachers promised to bestow. Others held that these applications could not procure spiritual redemption—only by knowledge (gnosis) could such redemption be effected.

Baptism and Trinitarian Baptismal Formula
Eusebius of Caesarea writes that the Marcosians baptised people "Into the name of the unknown father of the universe, into truth, the mother of all things, into the one that descended upon Jesus." This may show that the Trinitarian baptismal formula existed at least at that time, and probably earlier, and that the Marcosians adopted it as their own.
  
Marcus taught that the baptism of the visible Jesus was but for the forgiveness of sins, but that the redemption of Christ, who in that baptism descended, was for perfection; the one was merely psychical, the other spiritual. Of the latter are interpreted the words in which Jesus spoke of another baptism.

Some conferred this redemption by baptism with special invocations; others went so far as to reject Christian baptism and to substitute a mixture of oil and water which they poured over the head of the candidate. By confirmation the Gnostics intended not so much to give the Holy Ghost as to seal the candidates against the attacks of the Archons, by which the initiated would after death become incomprehensible and invisible, and leaving their bodies in this lower creation and their souls with the Demiurge, ascend in their spirits to the Pleroma. Probably the Egyptian religion contributed this element to Gnosticism. Some of these Marcosian formulae were in Hebrew, of which Irenaeus has preserved specimens much corrupted by copyists.

Eucharist
A knowledge of astrology was among Marcus's accomplishments, and apparently some chemical knowledge, with which he gained a reputation of magical skill. The eucharistic cup of mingled wine and water was seen under his invocation to change to a purple red; and his disciples were told that this was because the great Charis (Grace) had dropped some of her blood into the cup. Sometimes he would hand the cup to women, and bid them in his presence pronounce the eucharistic words:

Then he would pour from their consecrated cup into a much larger one held by himself, and the liquor, miraculously increased at this prayer, would be seen to rise up and fill the larger vessel.

Prophecy
Marcus taught his female disciples to prophesy. Casting lots at their meetings, he would command her on whom the lot fell boldly to utter the words which were suggested to her mind, and such words were accepted by the hearers as prophetic utterances.

See also
Marcus (Marcosian)
Colarbasians
Valentinus
Valentinianism

References

Attribution

External links
 Counting with 2 numbers, more gnostic counting

Gnosticism